These species of concealer moths belong to the genus Philobota.

Philobota species

 Philobota abductella (Walker, 1864)
 Philobota aceraea (Meyrick, 1883)
 Philobota acerba (Turner, 1939)
 Philobota achranta (Turner, 1917)
 Philobota acompsa (Turner, 1939)
 Philobota acropola Meyrick, 1884
 Philobota actias (Lower, 1899)
 Philobota aedophanes Turner, 1944
 Philobota aethalea (Meyrick, 1883)
 Philobota agnesella (Newman, 1856)
 Philobota agrapha Turner, 1917
 Philobota amblopis Turner, 1944
 Philobota amblys Turner, 1944
 Philobota ameles Turner, 1944
 Philobota ancylotoxa Meyrick, 1884
 Philobota angustella (Walker, 1864)
 Philobota apora (Meyrick, 1883)
 Philobota arabella (Newman, 1856)
 Philobota archepeda (Meyrick, 1888)
 Philobota argotoxa Meyrick, 1889
 Philobota asemantica (Turner, 1944)
 Philobota atmobola Meyrick, 1884
 Philobota atmopis (Meyrick, 1889)
 Philobota atrisignis (Lower, 1900)
 Philobota austalea (Meyrick, 1884)
 Philobota auxolyca Meyrick, 1889
 Philobota baryptera (Turner, 1896)
 Philobota barysoma (Meyrick, 1883)
 Philobota basicapna (Turner, 1937)
 Philobota basiphaia Common, 1996
 Philobota bathrogramma (Turner, 1916)
 Philobota bathrophaea (Turner, 1914)
 Philobota biophora Meyrick, 1884
 Philobota brachystoma (Meyrick, 1915)
 Philobota byrsochra (Meyrick, 1915)
 Philobota calamaea Meyrick, 1884
 Philobota callistis (Meyrick, 1889)
 Philobota candida (Turner, 1898)
 Philobota capnonota (Turner, 1938)
 Philobota carinaria Meyrick, 1913
 Philobota catharopa Turner, 1944
 Philobota celaenopa (Turner, 1936)
 Philobota centromita Turner, 1944
 Philobota cephalochrysa (Lower, 1894)
 Philobota chionoptera Meyrick, 1884
 Philobota chlorella (Meyrick, 1883)
 Philobota chrysopotama Meyrick, 1884
 Philobota cirrhocephala (Turner, 1917)
 Philobota cirrhopepla (Turner, 1916)
 Philobota clastosticha (Turner, 1939)
 Philobota cnecopasta (Turner, 1937)
 Philobota comarcha (Meyrick, 1920)
 Philobota cosmocrates Meyrick, 1889
 Philobota crassinervis (Lower, 1900)
 Philobota cretacea Meyrick, 1884
 Philobota crocopleura Turner, 1944
 Philobota crossoxantha (Lower, 1907)
 Philobota crypsichola Meyrick, 1884
 Philobota cryptea (Turner, 1938)
 Philobota curvilinea (Turner, 1896)
 Philobota cyphocentra (Meyrick, 1922)
 Philobota dedecorata Meyrick, 1915
 Philobota delochorda (Turner, 1917)
 Philobota delosema Turner, 1917
 Philobota delosticha (Lower, 1915)
 Philobota deltoloma (Lower, 1923)
 Philobota diaereta Turner, 1917
 Philobota dichotoma (Turner, 1941)
 Philobota dictyodes (Meyrick, 1889)
 Philobota dysphorata (Turner, 1938)
 Philobota egena (Turner, 1940)
 Philobota ellenella (Newman, 1856)
 Philobota embologramma (Turner, 1916)
 Philobota enchalca Turner, 1917
 Philobota ennephela (Meyrick, 1883)
 Philobota epibosca (Turner, 1937)
 Philobota epipercna (Turner, 1917)
 Philobota erebodes Meyrick, 1884
 Philobota eremosema Lower, 1915
 Philobota eremotropha (Turner, 1938)
 Philobota euageta Turner, 1944
 Philobota euarmosta Turner, 1944
 Philobota euchlora (Turner, 1896)
 Philobota euethira (Turner, 1944)
 Philobota euzancla (Turner, 1938)
 Philobota foedatella (Walker, 1864)
 Philobota fumifera (Turner, 1939)
 Philobota futilis Meyrick, 1920
 Philobota glaucoptera Meyrick, 1884
 Philobota gonostropha Lower, 1896
 Philobota grammatica (Meyrick, 1883)
 Philobota haplogramma (Turner, 1917)
 Philobota haplostola (Turner, 1937)
 Philobota hemera (Meyrick, 1886)
 Philobota hemeris Meyrick, 1915
 Philobota hemichrysa (Lower, 1916)
 Philobota heptasticta (Turner, 1937)
 Philobota heterophaea Turner, 1944
 Philobota hexasticta (Turner, 1937)
 Philobota hiracistis Meyrick, 1889
 Philobota homochroa (Turner, 1916)
 Philobota homophyla (Turner, 1937)
 Philobota humerella (Walker, 1863)
 Philobota hydara Meyrick, 1884
 Philobota hylophila (Turner, 1917)
 Philobota hypocausta Meyrick, 1884
 Philobota hypopolia (Turner, 1917)
 Philobota ignava Meyrick, 1913
 Philobota immemor (Meyrick, 1913)
 Philobota impletella (Walker, 1869)
 Philobota incompta Turner, 1944
 Philobota iphigenes Meyrick, 1889
 Philobota ischnodes (Meyrick, 1902)
 Philobota ischnophanes (Turner, 1937)
 Philobota isomora Turner, 1915
 Philobota isonoma Common, 1996
 Philobota latifissella (Walker, 1864)
 Philobota laxeuta (Meyrick, 1913)
 Philobota leptochorda (Turner, 1916)
 Philobota leucodelta (Turner, 1938)
 Philobota limenarcha Meyrick, 1913
 Philobota lochmaula (Turner, 1917)
 Philobota lonchota Turner, 1896
 Philobota lutulenta (Meyrick, 1913)
 Philobota lysizona Meyrick, 1889
 Philobota macrostola (Turner, 1938)
 Philobota marcens Meyrick, 1914
 Philobota mathematica (Meyrick, 1883)
 Philobota melanoglypta Meyrick, 1889
 Philobota melanogypsa (Turner, 1938)
 Philobota melanoxantha Meyrick, 1889
 Philobota melanthes (Lower, 1899)
 Philobota meraca (Turner, 1937)
 Philobota metaxantha (Turner, 1941)
 Philobota microxantha Meyrick, 1889
 Philobota moestella (Walker, 1864)
 Philobota monogramma Meyrick, 1884
 Philobota monoides (Turner, 1917)
 Philobota monospila (Turner, 1937)
 Philobota mucida (Turner, 1938)
 Philobota myrochrista (Meyrick, 1920)
 Philobota napaea (Turner, 1917)
 Philobota nephelarcha Meyrick, 1884
 Philobota nephelota Turner, 1944
 Philobota obliviosa Meyrick, 1913
 Philobota ochlophila (Turner, 1938)
 Philobota olympias Meyrick, 1889
 Philobota omotypa Turner, 1944
 Philobota orecta (Turner, 1938)
 Philobota orescoa (Meyrick, 1883)
 Philobota orinoma Meyrick, 1884
 Philobota ortholoma (Turner, 1937)
 Philobota orthomita Turner, 1917
 Philobota orthotoma Turner, 1917
 Philobota oxyptila (Turner, 1937)
 Philobota pachychorda (Turner, 1937)
 Philobota pacifera (Meyrick, 1914)
 Philobota paragypsa Lower, 1900
 Philobota partitella (Walker, 1864)
 Philobota pasteoptera (Turner, 1937)
 Philobota pedetis Meyrick, 1884
 Philobota perangusta (Turner, 1936)
 Philobota perioeca (Turner, 1937)
 Philobota perixantha Turner, 1896
 Philobota perpetua (Meyrick, 1913)
 Philobota petrinodes (Lower, 1901)
 Philobota phaeodelta (Turner, 1937)
 Philobota philostaura (Meyrick, 1883)
 Philobota phlaura (Turner, 1938)
 Philobota physaula Meyrick, 1914
 Philobota pilidiota (Turner, 1917)
 Philobota pilipes (Butler, 1882)
 Philobota placophaea (Turner, 1937)
 Philobota plesiosperma (Turner, 1937)
 Philobota pleurosticha (Turner, 1936)
 Philobota plicilinea (Turner, 1938)
 Philobota polypenthes (Turner, 1939)
 Philobota prepodes (Turner, 1937)
 Philobota productella (Walker, 1864)
 Philobota profuga (Meyrick, 1913)
 Philobota proscedes (Turner, 1936)
 Philobota protecta Meyrick, 1920
 Philobota protorthra (Meyrick, 1883)
 Philobota psacasta (Meyrick, 1883)
 Philobota psammochroa (Lower, 1894)
 Philobota publicana (Meyrick, 1914)
 Philobota pulvifera (Turner, 1937)
 Philobota pycnoda (Lower, 1907)
 Philobota pyrota (Meyrick, 1889)
 Philobota rhadinosticha (Turner, 1938)
 Philobota rhipidura (Meyrick, 1913)
 Philobota ruinosa (Meyrick, 1913)
 Philobota scieropa Meyrick, 1889
 Philobota scioessa (Turner, 1938)
 Philobota scitula (Turner, 1917)
 Philobota semantica (Turner, 1916)
 Philobota silignias (Lower, 1899)
 Philobota similis (Turner, 1937)
 Philobota sophia Turner, 1896
 Philobota sordidella (Walker, 1864)
 Philobota sphenoleuca Lower, 1907
 Philobota spodotis Turner, 1944
 Philobota stella (Newman, 1856)
 Philobota stenophylla (Turner, 1939)
 Philobota stenotypa (Turner, 1917)
 Philobota sthenopis Turner, 1927
 Philobota stictoloma (Turner, 1944)
 Philobota stramentaria (Turner, 1916)
 Philobota strigatella (Donovan, 1805)
 Philobota strongyla (Turner, 1936)
 Philobota susanae (Lower, 1900)
 Philobota syncolla (Turner, 1917)
 Philobota syneches (Turner, 1914)
 Philobota synnephes (Turner, 1937)
 Philobota tanyscia (Meyrick, 1883)
 Philobota thiobaphes (Turner, 1937)
 Philobota thiocrossa (Turner, 1917)
 Philobota thiogramma Meyrick, 1889
 Philobota tranquilla (Turner, 1937)
 Philobota transversella (Walker, 1864)
 Philobota trigonosema (Turner, 1937)
 Philobota xanthastis (Meyrick, 1889)
 Philobota xanthodisca Turner, 1944
 Philobota xanthopolia (Turner, 1941)
 Philobota xanthoprepes Turner, 1917
 Philobota xerodes (Lower, 1900)
 Philobota xipheres Turner, 1896
 Philobota xiphopepla (Lower, 1920)
 Philobota xiphostola Meyrick, 1884
 Philobota xuthocrana (Turner, 1937)
 Philobota xylochroa (Lower, 1893)
 Philobota zalias (Lower, 1899)

References

Philobota